The Three Musketeers: One for All! is a WiiWare version of The Three Musketeers by Legendo Entertainment and it was released in North America on July 27, 2009 and in the PAL regions on July 31, 2009.

Gameplay
The game, which features two-dimensional movement through a cartoonish three-dimensional environment, is loosely based on the 1844 Alexandre Dumas, père classic The Three Musketeers. In the game, the player controls Porthos in an attempt to save his kidnapped companions.

Reception
The PC version of the game was nominated for a 2006 Swedish Game Award in the category Family Game of the Year. The WiiWare version holds an average score of 53 from metacritic.

References

External links
 People who worked on The Three Musketeers: One for All! via Mobygames
 Official Game Page on Nintendo's website (US)
 Official Game Page on Legendo's website (Sweden)
 Story Trailer from GameTrailers
 The Abbey Trailer from GameTrailers
 NintendoLife review of the Wii version

2009 video games
Video games developed in Sweden
WiiWare games
Wii-only games
Wii games
Video games based on works by Alexandre Dumas
Video games set in France
Video games set in the 17th century
Legendo Entertainment games
Single-player video games